Carneades quadrinodosa is a species of beetle in the family Cerambycidae. It was described by Per Olof Christopher Aurivillius in 1902. It is known from Colombia.

References

Colobotheini
Beetles described in 1902